Religious sector opposition against the dictatorship of President Ferdinand Marcos included leaders and workers belonging to different beliefs and denominations.

Christian 
Many of these leaders and workers belonged to the Catholic Church in the Philippines, to which belonged the majority of the Philippine population at the time. But various forms of opposition were also notable in other Christian denominations including the Philippine Independent Church, the United Church of Christ in the Philippines, the United Methodist Church in the Philippines, and individual Filipino Evangelical churches such as the Diliman Bible Church.

Muslim 
Muslim Filipinos had been targeted by repressive policies of the Marcos Administration since even before the imposition of Martial Law in 1972, with the Jabidah Massacre of 18 March 1968 being a watershed moment for discontent. The Muslim Independence Movement (MIM) was formed two months later on 1 May 1968, although it was sidelined only five months later when its leader, former Cotabato governor Datu Udtog Matalam, joined the Marcos Administration as Adviser on Muslim Affairs. Although the MIM failed to gain the support of the Muslim masses, President Marcos used its existence (along with that of the recently formed Communist Party of the Philippines) as one of the reasons for proclaiming Martial Law on 23 September 1972. In December 1972 the MIM ceased to exist when Matalam surrendered to Marcos, although a splinter group, the Moro National Liberation Front, had earlier formed in October 1972.

Indigenous faiths 
Religious beliefs of indigenous Filipinos also factored into their opposition against the Marcos dictatorship, the most popular example being the Kalinga and Bontoc peoples' resistance against Marcos' Chico River Dam Project in Luzon, in no small part because ancestral lands are sacred in their belief systems. The subsequent assassination of the Kalinga Butbut tribe Pangat (elder) Macli-ing Dulag on 24 April 1980 led to the first major news story coverage critical of Marcos administration policies during Martial Law, dealing a severe blow to the public relations efforts of the Marcos regime.

Major events

Before the declaration of Martial Law 
December 30, 1965 - Ferdinand Marcos is sworn in as the tenth president of the Philippiness, under the Third Republic. 
May 21, 1967 - A demonstration conducted by Lapiang Malaya sect ends in a violent dispersal attempt by the Philippine Constabulary, killing 33.
March 18, 1968 - The Jabidah Massacre, where 68 Muslim members of a secret commando unit recruited by the Armed Forces of the Philippines are killed when they refuse further training.

After the declaration of Martial Law
Aug. 24, 1974 - The Sacred Heart Novitiate of the Society of Jesus in Novaliches is raided by the military, who were allegedly searching for Communist Party of the Philippines leader Jose Maria Sison. Jesuit priest Jose Blanco is arrested as a suspected rebel.
May 12–13, 1975 - The Episcopal Commission on Tribal Filipinos of the Catholic Bishops' Conference of the Philippines helped organize bodong (peace pact meeting) involving 150 Bontoc and Kalinga leaders and Church-based support groups, at St. Bridget's School in eastern Quezon City. The Quezon City bodong resulted in an agreement (Pagta ti Bodong) which united the Bontoc and Kalinga people in opposition against the Chico River Dam Project, which would have submerged sacred tribal lands, and the Marcos Administration, which was pushing for the project to push through.
April 24, 1980 - Macli-ing Dulag, Pangat (elder) of the Butbut tribe of Kalinga, is assassinated for his resistance efforts against the Chico River Dam Project
January 17, 1981 - As a public relations move – partly in light of the visit of Pope John Paul II to the Philippines, and partly in light of the upcoming inauguration of United States President Ronald Reagan – Ferdinand Marcos issues Proclamation No. 2405, formally lifting the state of Martial Law nationwide. He nonetheless retained most of his powers as dictator, including "the right to suspend the writ of habeas corpus for crimes related to subversion, insurrection, rebellion, and also conspiracy to commit such crimes." 
February 17–22, 1981 - Pope John Paul II makes his first apostolic visit to the Philippines. He declares in a speech that "Even in exceptional situations that may at times arise, one can never justify any violation of the fundamental dignity of the human person or of the basic rights that safeguard this dignity."
February 22, 1986 - Speaking on Church-owned Radio Veritas, Jaime Cardinal Sin, the reigning Archbishop of Manila, broadcasts an appeal urging Filipinos to peacefully gather on EDSA to protect forces that had defected from the Marcos government.
 February 26, 1986 - From Clark Air Base, the Marcos family and a select group of close followers, leave the country for exile in Hawaii.

Martyrs and Heroes honored at the Bantayog ng mga Bayani 

Religious leaders and workers represent a significant portion of the names inscribed on the memorial wall of the Bantayog ng mga Bayani (Memorial of the Heroes) along Quezon Avenue, which honors the "Martyrs and Heroes" who resisted the Marcos dictatorship.

Fr. Zacarias Agatep 

Nicknamed "Apo Kari", Fr. Agatep (6 September 1936 – 27 October 1982) was the parish priest of Our Lady of Hope Parish in Caoayan, Ilocos Sur. Fr. Agatep helped organize cooperatives, taught interested farmers about land reform, and spoke against foreign and local monopolies in the tobacco industry, which formed the backbone of Ilocos Sur's economy at the time. He was arrested for supposed "subversion" in 1980 and was incarcerated for four months until he was released as part of Marcos public relations efforts in preparation for a visit by Pope John Paul II. Upon his release, he famously wrote a letter to the President, decrying what he described as a "frame-up" and lamenting the miscarriage of justice typical under the Marcos administration. He kept speaking out against the abuses of the Marcos administration until he was shot four times in the back by unidentified gunmen in October 1982.

Fr. Godofredo Alingal 
Nicknamed "Father Ling" by his parishioners, Fr. Alingal (24 June 1922 – 13 April 1981) was a Jesuit priest and journalist who spoke out against repression and militarization under Marcos' Martial Law on the prelature's radio station, DXBB, and its newsletter, An Bandilyo. He was also instrumental in the formation of a credit union and grains marketing cooperative for farmers, and helped organize the Kibawe, Bukidnon chapter of the Federation of Free Farmers. When the government shut down DXBB, he kept his parishioners informed through a "blackboard news service" — one of the more inventive forms that the Philippines' "Mosquito Press" took while traditional media outlets were shut down under Martial Law. He was shot by an unidentified gunman on 13 April 1981.

Trifonio N. Andres 
"Ponyong" Andres (18 October 1953 - 17 August 1983)  was a Roman Catholic seminarian at the St. Francis Xavier Seminary in Davao who volunteered to document human rights violations in Davao for Task Force Detainees of the Philippines and the Citizen's Council for Justice and Peace. He was abducted in Libungan, Cotabato and brought to the Davao Metropolitan District Command Center (Metrodiscom) in Digos, Davao del Sur, where he was tortured and later executed on 17 August 1983.

Jeremias Ancheta Aquino 
A priest of the Iglesia Filipina Independiente, Father Jerry Aquino (1 June 1949 – 14 December 1981) was a member of the Student Christian Movement of the Philippines and of Christians for National Liberation. In 1977-1978 he was director of the Ecumenical Center for Development, and missionary priest of the Philippine Independent Church's Diocese of Greater Manila. In 1978, he became the program coordinator and youth director of the Philippine Independent Church's Laoag (Ilocos Norte) diocese, and concurrent associate rector of Pagudpud, Ilocos Norte. It was during this posting that was arrested in September 1979, in Sadanga, Mountain Province. He and several companions were held at the Philippine Constabulary stockade in Bontoc, then transferred to the Bicutan jail in Metro Manila. After prolonged fasting and hunger strikes to protest prison conditions, he was released on 24 December 1980, part of a series of prisoner releases meant to generate positive press in light of the arrival of Pope John Paul II in Manila two months later. Upon release, he helped found the Freedom Shop, a carpentry shop for unemployed former political prisoners. He died in a "suspicious" vehicular accident on 14 December 1981.

Filomena Asuncion 
A deaconess of the United Methodist Church in the Philippines, Liway Asuncion (30 March 1954 – 25 June 1983) was a graduate of BA in Christian Education at Harris Memorial College, before returning to her home congregation in Isabela to serve as Christian education and music director, teaching Sunday school, conducting Bible studies, leading the church choir, and becoming president of the district-wide United Methodist Youth Fellowship. In 1979, Asuncion joined an ecumenical movement of Catholics and Protestants called Timpuyog Dagiti Iglesia (Ilocano for "Fellowship of the Churches"), which sought to address the plight of exploited farmers in Isabela, where land ownership was monopolized by a few elite families. In 1981 she was among those arrested at a farmers’ protest rally in Ilagan and jailed from April to October. Upon her release, she joined the revolutionary underground and worked full-time in organizing the local farmers in defense of their rights. Witnesses said she was captured alive by government forces in 1983 and was then maltreated and abused before being killed.

Romeo Guilao Crismo 
As executive secretary of the United Methodist Youth Fellowship, Romeo Crismo (8 December 1955–[disappeared] 12 August 1980) was instrumental in organizing the Protestant youth sector to resist the policies and programs of the dictatorship. Supporting himself by teaching, he also worked with the Student Christian Movement of the Philippines, the National Council of Churches in the Philippines, and the Christian Conference of Asia.

Sr. Mariani Dimaranan 

Sr. Mariani Dimaranan, SFIC (February 1, 1925 - December 17, 2005) was a Franciscan nun best known for leading the Task Force Detainees of the Philippines for 21 years, including the entirety of the 14-year Marcos dictatorship. Sr. Mariani led the Manila-based non-profit national human rights organization in documenting human rights violations, assisting victims and their families, organizing missions, conducting human rights education work, campaigning against torture, and promoting advocacy for Human Rights Defenders.

Fr. Joe Dizon 

An activist Roman Catholic priest, Father Jose Dizon (September 29, 1948 – November 4, 2013), led protest actions against government corruption and human rights abuses during martial law in the Philippines, political dynasties, and the pork barrel system. At protest rallies against the Marcos dictatorship, he would say mass to prevent violent dispersal by the government and to boost the morale of demonstrators. He actively campaigned for honest elections and helped form people's organizations in rural areas to support those dealing with land grabbing, military abuses, and hamletting. He died of complications from diabetes at the National Kidney and Transplant Institute on November 12, 2013, at the age of 65.

Fr. Tullio Favali 

A Roman Catholic missionary priest sent by the Pontifical Institute for Foreign Missions, Father Favali (10 December 1946 – 11 April 1985) was the first foreign missionary to be killed during the years of the Marcos dictatorship. While serving as a parish priest in La Esperanza, Tulunan, North Cotabato, Fr. Favali was called by the townspeople for help after the Marcos government's paramilitary forces, led by Edilberto, Norberto, Jr., and Elpidio Manero, shot the town's tailor. When the Manero brothers saw him arrive and enter a house, Norberto, Jr. dragged his motorcycle and set it on fire. When Favali hurried out after seeing the fire, Edilberto shot the priest point-blank in his head, trampled on his body and fired again. This caused the priest's skull to crack open, and Norberto, Jr. picked at the brains and displayed them to horrified witnesses. The brothers, along with a few other gang members, stood by laughing and heckling.

Inocencio T. Ipong 

A Roman Catholic Lay Worker with the Rural Missionaries of the Philippines (RMP), "Boy" Ipong (28 December 1945 – 21 November 1983) was the son of migrants from Bohol who settled in North Cotabato, so he felt drawn to the plight of poor peasants in the Visayas and Mindanao. Wanting to help them, he joined the youth organization Khi Rho, and later the Federation of Free Farmers. When Martial Law was declared in 1972, he began working as a lay assistant at the RMP with its vision of a "free, just, peaceful, and egalitarian society." In 1982, he was abducted and illegally detained at the Metropolitan District Command Headquarters and at Camp Catitipan in Davao City. He was tortured by his captors who wanted him to admit that he was a certain “Enciong” the military was looking for. His family and his coworkers at the Rural Missionaries of the Philippines spent ten days looking for him and upon finding him, successfully negotiated his release. On November 20, 1983, he was among a group of 12 religious and laypeople who were going to Cebu to attend a seminar, on board the M/V Cassandra. A passing typhoon caused the ship to sink, drowning over 200 passengers in the waters off Surigao, including everyone from Ipong's group.

Bishop Julio Xavier Labayen

Julio Xavier Labayen, OCD, DD, (23 July 1926 – 27 April 2016) was a Roman Catholic bishop. Ordained to the priesthood in 1955, Labayen served as Bishop of the Territorial Prelature of Infanta from 1966 until 2003. He was the first Filipino Carmelite bishop when he was ordained on 8 September 1966 and the second bishop of the Prelature of Infanta. He was a staunch defender of human rights, especially during the years of the Martial Law in the Philippines, being known to be one of the "Magnificent 7" who voiced their opposition against the Marcos regime.
In recognition of his efforts against authoritarian rule, his name was inscribed on the Wall of Remembrance at the Bantayog ng mga Bayani in 2016. Aside from this, the bishop served as chair of the CBCP's National Secretariat for Social Action-Justice and Peace (NASSA).

Cardinal Jaime Sin 

Jaime Cardinal Sin (31 August 1928 – 21 June 2005) was elevated to the Catholic College of Cardinals in 1976, having been enthroned as the 30th Archbishop of Manila in 1974, succeeding Rufino Cardinal Santos. He quickly became an influential voice in Philippine national life, frequently issuing statements regarding political developments, the economy, and moral concerns. It was his call on Church-owned Radio Veritas for civilians to peacefully assemble at Camp Aguinaldo and Camp Crame along Epifanio De los Santos Avenue that first sparked the 1986 EDSA Revolution, which eventually led to the fall of the Marcos dictatorship. He died on 21 June 2005, aged 76.

Sr. Violeta Marcos 

Ma. Violeta Marcos, AMP (July 18, 1937 - April 30, 2001) was a Catholic nun who was best known as the co-founder and first director of the Augustinian Missionaries of the Philippines (AMP) and for her contributions to the resistance against the Marcos dictatorship and Martial Law - first through her diocesan social action involvements in Negros Occidental, and later as part of the human rights organization Task Force Detainees of the Philippines (TFDP).

Rev. Magnifico Osorio 

Rev. Magnifico L. Osorio (December 15, 1934 - March 29, 1985) was a Methodist Pastor and human rights advocate best known for championing the rights of indigenous people in the province of Palawan and his murder during the waning days of the Marcos dictatorship. He was not known to have political affiliations nor leanings, but his humanitarian work and the circumstances of his murder have led him to be considered a Martyr of the resistance against the dictatorship, and his name is inscribed on the Wall of Remembrance at the Bantayog.

Fernando Tayao Pastor, Sr. 

A preacher of the Church of Christ denomination, Fernando Pastor, Sr. (25 May 1956 - 8 February 1986)  had also served as Captain of Barangay Rizal, in the Municipality of Diffun, Quirino. As such, he was one of those community leaders who were forced to keep silent about the abuses under Orlando Dulay, who had been constabulary commander, governor, and assemblyman of Quirino province. When snap presidential polls were called in 1985, Pastor decided to campaign for Corazon Aquino, and eventually became the provincial vice-chair of the United Nationalist Democratic Organization (UNIDO). This displeased Dulay, who was the provincial coordinator of the Marcos political party, Kilusang Bagong Lipunan (KBL). On the eve of the 1986 snap elections, Pastor, his oldest son Fernando Pastor, Jr. and colleague Francisco Laurella were walking on their way home when they were abducted by Dulay himself and two of his men. They were taken to Dulay's residence and kept inside a van for three days. The tortured and mutilated bodies of the younger Pastor and Francisco Laurella were found near a ravine three days later, and that of the elder Pastor five days after. It took four years before Dulay was eventually caught and charged in 1990, and was sentenced to life imprisonment by the Quezon City regional trial court.

Fr. Nilo Castillejos Valerio, Jr. 
Father Nilo Valerio (20 Feb 1950 - 24 August 1985) was a Catholic priest of the Society of the Divine Word assigned to a parish in the upland province of Abra, where he established cooperatives and a school, ministered to remote communities of the Tingguian people, and supported them in protecting their ancestral lands from takeover by Marcos cronies. He was killed and beheaded by government forces on 24 August 1985.

Sr. Mary Christine Tan 

Sr. Mary Christine Tan, RGS, AMRSP (November 30, 1930 – October 6, 2003), was a missionary, nun, and activist, who headed the Association of Major Religious Superiors of Women (AMRSP) from 1973 to 1976, a group of religious mothers who not only vocalized their disdain against the Marcos administration, but also managed to help Filipinos who were suffering from poverty. She later served as a member of the 1987 Philippine constitutional plebiscite.

See also 
 Torture methods used by the Marcos dictatorship

External links 
 Center for Media Freedom and Responsibility: The Religious Press and the Marcos Years

References 

Presidency of Ferdinand Marcos
Religious workers honored at the Bantayog ng mga Bayani
Opposition to Ferdinand Marcos